Chah Mazar-e Sofla (also Romanized as Chāh Mazār-e Soflá and Chāh-e Mazār Soflá; also known as Chāh Mazar, Chāh Mazār-e Pā’īn, and Chāh Mīrzā Pā’īn) is a village in Jolgeh-ye Musaabad Rural District, in the Central District of Torbat-e Jam County, Razavi Khorasan Province, Iran. At the 2006 census, its population was 300, in 72 families.

References 

Populated places in Torbat-e Jam County